Truth or Consequences is an American radio and TV quiz show.

Truth or Consequences may also refer to:

Television episodes 
 "Truth or Consequences" (All Grown Up!)
 "Truth or Consequences" (Lie to Me)
 "Truth or Consequences" (NCIS)
 "Truth or Consequences" (Popular)
 "Truth or Consequences" (Supergirl)

Other
 Truth or Consequences, New Mexico, a city renamed for the quiz show
 Truth or Consequences, N.M. (film), a 1997 film
 Truth or Consequences Hot Springs
 Hot Springs Bathhouse and Commercial Historic District in Truth or Consequences
 "Truth or Consequences", a Zygon terrorist organization featured in Doctor Who

See also 
 Truth and Consequences (disambiguation)
 Truth and Consequence, a Swedish film